

Albums
These are the studio albums by Harry Nilsson, released by Tower Records, RCA Records and Mercury Records. His final album was released in 2019 via Omnivore Recordings.

Studio albums

Soundtracks

Archive releases

Remixes

Compilations

Singles

Notes

References

External links
 Official Harry Nilsson website

Discographies of American artists
Rock music discographies
Discography